Dear Ephesus was an American Christian alternative rock band from Orlando, Florida. They were voted third-favorite new group of 1997 by HM Magazine readers, and went on to release two albums. The band broke up at the end of the 1990s.

Several members re-formed as Tenderfoot, hoping to fill their Bulletproof Records contract and reach the secular market. They had one release under this name, The Devil And Rock And Roll, in 2000.

Band members 

 Aaron Wiederspahn – vocals
 Brett Levsen – guitar
 Ed Lamoso – guitar
 Louis Defabrizio – bass
 Jeff Irizarry – drums

Discography 

 A View of Epic Proportions EP (1995, Review: HM Magazine, Cross Rhythms)
 The Consolation of Pianissimo (1997, Reviews: The Phantom Tollbooth, Cross Rhythms)
 The Absent Sounds of Me (1998, Reviews: HM Magazine, The Phantom Tollbooth)

Trivia 

 The hidden track on the album The Consolation Of Pianissimo is not titled Sutton Blaze (as is often cited), but actually Sutton Place, a reference to an apartment complex where a friend lived and band members often hung out.
 Aaron Weiderspahn is now a writer and director. His first film is The Sensation of Sight (2006), starring David Strathairn and Ian Somerhalder from Lost.
 Brett Levsen and Edgardo Lamoso are currently playing in The Vanity Plan.
 Louis Defabrizio currently fronts the band Gasoline Heart along with Jeff Irizarry and John Forston from Squad 5–0.

References

External links 
 
 HM Magazine profile
 Dear Ephesus Myspace Page

Emo musical groups from Florida
Christian rock groups from Florida
Musical groups from Orlando, Florida
Musical groups established in 1997